Three60 is a cylindrical residential skyscraper under construction in Manchester, England. The building is part of the second phase of the Crown Street development area at the southern end of Deansgate in the city centre, behind the Deansgate Square skyscraper cluster. It was designed by SimpsonHaugh architects.

History

Planning
The planning application was submitted to Manchester City Council in April 2020 for two adjacent towers, The Cylinder (subsequently renamed Three60) and The Blade, to form the second phase of developer Renaker's Crown Street development, consisting of a combined total of 855 apartments across  of residential space. Three60 will contain 441 apartments. The towers are to be connected at the lower levels by a podium containing  of commercial space.

Planning approval was obtained in July 2020.

Construction
Construction of the building commenced in 2021.

See also
List of tallest buildings in the United Kingdom
List of tallest buildings and structures in Greater Manchester

References

Unfinished buildings and structures
Buildings and structures in Manchester
Skyscrapers in Manchester
Residential skyscrapers in England
Apartment buildings in England
Residential buildings in Manchester